The Alfidia gens was a minor plebeian family of ancient Rome. Few members of this gens are known from history, of whom the most familiar may be Alfidia the mother of Livia, the first Roman empress. At least one of the Alfidii attained the consulship, Lucius Alfidius Herennianus in AD 171.

Members

 Marcus Alfidius, the maternal grandfather of the empress Livia.
 Marcus M. f. Alfidius, maternal uncle of Livia.
 Alfidia, the wife of Marcus Livius Drusus Claudianus and mother of Livia.
 Decimus Alfidius Hypsaeus, one of the aediles at Pompei in AD 2.
 Alfidius Sabinus, proconsul of Sicily some time in the 20s AD.
 Lucius Alfidius Herennianus, consul in AD 171, was the husband of Julia Calvina.
 Lucius Alfidius Urbanus, a second or third-century Hispano-Roman military officer of equestrian rank.

See also
 List of Roman gentes

Notes

References

Bibliography
 Klaus Zmeskal, Adfinitas: Die Verwandtschaften der senatorischen Führungsschicht der römischen Republik von 218–31 v. Chr (Adfinity: Kinship of the Senatorial Elite of the Roman State from AD 218 to 231), vol. 1, Karl Stutz Verlag (2009), .

Roman gentes